The National Cash Register Building, commonly referred to as the St. Johns Theater & Pub, was a building that was first erected in St. Louis, Missouri, for the Louisiana Purchase Exposition in 1904 and then moved to Portland, Oregon, the next year for the Lewis and Clark Centennial Exposition. It was moved a third and final time to the suburb of St. Johns, Oregon, which is now a part of Portland. It was given to the St. Johns Congregational Society by the NCR Corporation. It now houses a McMenamins theater and pub.

History
The NCR Corporation constructed a $5,000 building for the 1904 Louisiana Purchase Exposition in St. Louis, Missouri. The building was uprooted for $1,000 and transported to Portland, Oregon, for the 1905 Lewis and Clark Centennial Exposition. The building was constructed in sections so that it could be moved with ease. The NCR Corporation passed out badges and sang songs on "NCR Day" at the exposition on September 4, 1905. The Morning Oregonian reported that the building was "crowded all day".

After the exposition closed, the NCR Corporation donated it to the St. Johns Congregational Society of St. Johns, Oregon. On June 3, 1906, the National Cash Register Building was dedicated by Rev. Fred J. Warren of the St. Johns Congregational Society. Several ministers and parishioners of other Congregational churches were in attendance. The First Congregational Church of Portland donated stained glass windows that read "The Bible and the Cross and Crown". Another donation of $1,200 was given by the Congregational Church Building Society for the purposes of moving the structure. 

By 1930, the building was occupied by the YWCA. It is currently used as a theater and pub by the McMenamins chain.

References

1904 establishments in Oregon
Buildings and structures in St. Johns, Portland, Oregon
Cinemas and movie theaters in Oregon
Churches in Portland, Oregon
McMenamins
NCR Corporation
Religious buildings and structures completed in 1904
Relocated buildings and structures in Oregon
Restaurants in Portland, Oregon
Louisiana Purchase Exposition
Theatres in Portland, Oregon
World's fair architecture in the United States
YWCA buildings
Portland Historic Landmarks
Former churches in Oregon
Lewis and Clark Centennial Exposition